Several of the 17 autonomous communities of the Kingdom of Spain, plus the 2 autonomous cities, have their own anthems, ranging from quasi-national anthems of the historical nationalities to regional anthems and songs, with some virtually unknown even in their own communities. Below is a list of those songs.

See also
 Autonomous communities of Spain
 Flags of the autonomous communities of Spain
 Coats of arms of the autonomous communities of Spain
 List of regional anthems

Spain
Spain geography-related lists
 Anthems
Autonomous communities